Petar Valchanov (born May 15, 1982) is a Bulgarian filmmaker. He is best known for his cinematography on feature films such as The Lesson (2014), Glory (2016) and The Father (2019).

Biography
Valchanov was born on 15 May 1982 in Plovdiv. He is the son of actress Vanya Bratoeva and artist Valchan Petrov. In 2000, he graduated from the Tsanko Lavrenov Art High School in Plovdiv. In 2008, he graduated from the National Academy for Theatre and Film Arts with a degree in film and television directing in the class of Ludmil Staikov.

Career
Valchanov has worked on many projects alongside his partner Kristina Grozeva including the short film Family Therapy (2008), the television film Emergency Landing (2010), Samburu (2011) and others.

In 2012, the pair co-wrote and co-directed the short film Jump, which was nominated for Best Short Film at the European Film Awards and won the Grand Prix at the Brussels Short Film Festival as well as best film at the Bulgarian Film Academy Awards in 2013.

Their debut feature film The Lesson (2014) received international recognition at numerous film festivals around the world, including festivals in Toronto, San Sebastián, Warsaw, Tokyo, Thessaloniki, Gothenburg, Sofia and many others, and is the most awarded Bulgarian film of all time. The Lesson is the first part of a trilogy inspired by newspaper articles. Valchanov and Grozeva were inspired by real events during the development of the script. They recalled: 

The second film from the trilogy, Glory, which premiered at the Locarno Film Festival was positively received by critics. Its plot revolves around a cantoner who finds millions on a railway line and then hands them over to the police. Glory won awards at many international film festivals and was selected as the Bulgarian entriy for the Best International Feature Film at the 90th Academy Awards

Before the last film of the trilogy, the pair directed 2019's The Father, which features a brief appearance by their then-student Maria Bakalova and won the Crystal Globe Award at the Karlovy Vary International Film Festival. Although the film is not autobiographical, Grozeva and Valchanov stated that the story was very personal to them and that the script was ready even before that of Glory. The Father wаs selected as the Bulgarian entry for the Best International Feature Film at the 93rd Academy Awards.

Selected filmography

References

External links 
 
 

1982 births
Living people
People from Plovdiv
Film people from Plovdiv
Bulgarian filmmakers
Bulgarian film directors
National Academy for Theatre and Film Arts alumni
Academic staff of the National Academy for Theatre and Film Arts